Now On My Way to Meet You (hangeul: 이제 만나러 갑니다, Ije mannareo gamnida) is a South Korean variety show which has been running on Channel A since December 4, 2011. It is part talk show, part talent show, and part beauty pageant. The guests are generally young female North Korean defectors (dubbed by the producers as "defector beauties") telling their experiences in getting to South Korea as well as North Korean lifestyle, products, and acclimating to South Korean life. The guests are questioned by four male panelists, and perform comedy sketches, songs, and dance. The show is broadcast on Sunday nights at 11:00 PM over cable television, and is shot in Goyang, a satellite city northwest of Seoul.

When debuted, the show was about people seeking to unite with defectors to whom they may be related. Episodes were shot at people's homes or in restaurants. The show never facilitated such reunions, and quickly changed format to a variety show shot in a "glitzy game-show-type set". The show has been credited by the North Korean defector guests with changing the perception that South Koreans have of North Korean defectors and taking the stigma out of being a North Korean defector, but also criticized by defectors for exaggerating or falsifying negative aspects of life in the north to gain viewers.

As of 2019, about 400 North Korean defectors have appeared on the show. The most famous defector participant has been activist Yeonmi Park.

In April 2017, Unreported World produced a documentary, hosted by Seyi Rhodes, about the show.

References

Further reading
 

South Korean television talk shows
Works about North Korea–South Korea relations